The Roman Catholic Archdiocese of Malabo is the Metropolitan See for the Ecclesiastical province of Malabo in Equatorial Guinea.

History
 1855.10.10: Established as Apostolic Vicariate of Annobon, Corisco and Fernando Poo Islands from the Apostolic Vicariate of Two Guineas and Senegambia in Gabon 
 1904.05.12: Renamed as Apostolic Vicariate of Fernando Poo 
 1966.05.03: Promoted as Diocese of Santa Isabel 
 1974.04.14: Renamed as Diocese of Malabo 
 1982.10.15: Promoted as Metropolitan Archdiocese of Malabo

Ordinaries

Vicars Apostolic 
 Armengol Coll y Armengol, CMF (August 1890 – 21 April 1918)
 Nicolás González y Pérez, CMF (24 August 1918 – 23 March 1935)
 Leoncio Fernández Galilea, CMF (18 June 1935 – 15 February 1957)
 Francisco Gómez Marijuán, CMF (14 November 1957 – 3 May 1966)

Bishops and Archbishops of Malabo 
 Francisco Gómez Marijuán, CMF (3 May 1966 – 9 May 1974)
 Vicente Bernikon (9 May 1974 – 14 September 1976)
 Rafael María Nze Abuy, CMF (21 October 1982 – 7 July 1991)
 Ildefonso Obama Obono (9 July 1991 – 11 February 2015)
 Juan Nsue Edjang Mayé (11 February 2015 – )

Suffragan dioceses
 Bata
 Ebebiyin
Note: The Roman Catholic Diocese of Evinayong and the Roman Catholic Diocese of Mongomo were 
established as new suffragan sees (dioceses) of the Malabo Archdiocese Province by Pope Francis
on April 1, 2017

See also
 Roman Catholicism in Equatorial Guinea
 Roman Catholic dioceses in Equatorial Guinea

References

Sources
 GCatholic.org

Malabo
Religion in Malabo
Malabo